Bowmanella denitrificans  is a Gram-negative, heterotrophic and denitrifying bacterium from the genus of Bowmanella which has been isolated from shallow coastal water from the An-Ping Harbour in Tainan in Taiwan.

References

External links
Type strain of Bowmanella denitrificans at BacDive -  the Bacterial Diversity Metadatabase	

Alteromonadales
Bacteria described in 2006